Sylvanus William Godon  (June 18, 1809 – May 17, 1879) was an American naval officer who served in the Mexican–American and American Civil War.

Born in Philadelphia, Pennsylvania, Godon entered the United States Navy in 1819 as a midshipman. He joined the Navy at an early age as a way to receive an education after his father, a noted French mineralogist, went insane and became destitute. He served at sea in various parts of the world and was promoted passed midshipman in 1827, and to lieutenant on December 17, 1836.

Godon was accused of insubordination by Hull and sent back to the Navy Department for reassignment. He was found guilty of disobedience of orders and neglect of duty and sentenced to two years suspension from duty but the conviction was reversed by the Secretary of the Navy and no punishment occurred. Godon served during the Mexican–American War and commanded the bomb vessel  at the Siege of Veracruz in 1847.

He was made commander on September 14, 1855. In 1860 Godon, in command of the steam sloop of war , was assigned to the Africa Squadron. On August 8, 1860, he captured the slaver Erie, commanded by Nathaniel Gordon, off the mouth of the Congo River and forced that ship to unload its captive cargo at Monrovia, Liberia. He remained on station until sailing for home on August 13, 1861.

Promoted to captain effective July 16, 1862, he took part in the Battle of Port Royal under Admiral Samuel Francis Du Pont. Although not part of Du Pont's plan, he placed  in position to secure an enfilading fire on Fort Walker on Hilton Head Island, South Carolina, and materially assisted in silencing the batteries of the enemy. In 1863 he was promoted to commodore; and commanded the 4th Division of Admiral David Dixon Porter's fleet at the first and second battles of Fort Fisher, North Carolina, in December 1864 and January 1865.

At the close of the war he was made rear admiral, and commanded the South Atlantic or Brazil Squadron in 1866-1867. His last active employment was as commandant of the Brooklyn Navy Yard from May 1, 1868 until October 15, 1870. He retired from the Navy in June 18, 1871. Godon died on May 17, 1879 at his ancestral home in Blois, France. He was buried in Laurel Hill Cemetery, Section F, Lot 14, Philadelphia.

Citations

External links 

1809 births
1879 deaths
19th-century American naval officers
Burials at Laurel Hill Cemetery (Philadelphia)
Military personnel from Philadelphia
People of Pennsylvania in the American Civil War
Union Navy officers
United States Navy rear admirals
United States Navy personnel of the Mexican–American War